McWilliams is an unincorporated community in Redbank Township, Armstrong County, Pennsylvania, United States.

History
A post office called McWilliams was established in 1883 and remained in operation until 1907.

References

Unincorporated communities in Armstrong County, Pennsylvania
Unincorporated communities in Pennsylvania